The following is a list of rugby union stadiums in France, ordered by capacity. Currently all stadiums with a capacity of 10,000 or more which are the regular home venue of a club or national team, or are the regular host of major national or international rugby events, are included.

See also

List of rugby union stadiums by capacity
List of football stadiums in France
List of European stadiums by capacity

References

 
f
Rugby union stadiums